Robert Stewart Wallace (20 January 1893 – 16 October 1970) was a Scottish footballer who played in the English Football League for Nottingham Forest.

References

Scottish footballers
Nottingham Forest F.C. players
English Football League players
1893 births
1970 deaths
Association football defenders
Footballers from Greenock
Linfield F.C. players
Burton Town F.C. players